Aglaia brownii is a species of plant in the family Meliaceae. It is found in Australia, West Papua (Indonesia), and Papua New Guinea.

References

brownii
Sapindales of Australia
Flora of Western New Guinea
Flora of Papua New Guinea
Vulnerable biota of Queensland
Vulnerable flora of Australia
Flora of the Northern Territory
Flora of Queensland
Taxonomy articles created by Polbot